The Scout and Guide movement in the Solomon Islands is served by
 The Girl Guides Association of the Solomon Islands, member of the World Association of Girl Guides and Girl Scouts
 The Solomon Islands Scout Association, member of the World Organization of the Scout Movement

See also